The 1962–63 Sheffield Shield season was the 61st season of the Sheffield Shield, the domestic first-class cricket competition of Australia. Victoria won the championship which ended the winning streak of New South Wales.

Table

Statistics

Most Runs
Bob Cowper 813

Most Wickets
Ian Meckiff 47

References

Sheffield Shield
Sheffield Shield
Sheffield Shield seasons